In Greek mythology, Laomedon (/leɪˈɒmɪdɒn/; Ancient Greek: Λαομέδων means "ruler of the people") may refer to the following characters:

 Laomedon, also known as Lamedon, the king of Sicyon who gave up Antiope to Lycus.
Laomedon, a Trojan king and father of his successor Podarces (Priam).
 Laomedon, the Thespian son of Heracles and Meline, daughter of King Thespius of Thespiae. Laomedon and his 49 half-brothers were born of Thespius' daughters who were impregnated by Heracles in one night, for a week or in the course of 50 days while hunting for the Cithaeronian lion. Later on, the hero sent a message to Thespius to keep seven of these sons and send three of them in Thebes while the remaining forty, joined by Iolaus, were dispatched to the island of Sardinia to found a colony.
 Laomedon, an Ethiopian who went to Troy under the command of their leader, King Memnon, son of Tithonus and Eos. He was eventually slain by Thrasymedes, the Pylian son of Nestor during the Trojan War.
 Laomedon, one of the Suitors of Penelope. He came from Zacynthos along with other 43 wooers. Laomedon was ultimately killed by Odysseus, with the help of Eumaeus, Philoetius, and Telemachus, after returning from his 10-year journey.

Notes

References 

 Apollodorus, The Library with an English Translation by Sir James George Frazer, F.B.A., F.R.S. in 2 Volumes, Cambridge, MA, Harvard University Press; London, William Heinemann Ltd. 1921. ISBN 0-674-99135-4. Online version at the Perseus Digital Library. Greek text available from the same website.
 Athenaeus of Naucratis, The Deipnosophists or Banquet of the Learned. London. Henry G. Bohn, York Street, Covent Garden. 1854. Online version at the Perseus Digital Library.
 Athenaeus of Naucratis, Deipnosophistae. Kaibel. In Aedibus B.G. Teubneri. Lipsiae. 1887. Greek text available at the Perseus Digital Library.
 Diodorus Siculus, The Library of History translated by Charles Henry Oldfather. Twelve volumes. Loeb Classical Library. Cambridge, Massachusetts: Harvard University Press; London: William Heinemann, Ltd. 1989. Vol. 3. Books 4.59–8. Online version at Bill Thayer's Web Site
 Diodorus Siculus, Bibliotheca Historica. Vol 1-2. Immanel Bekker. Ludwig Dindorf. Friedrich Vogel. in aedibus B. G. Teubneri. Leipzig. 1888-1890. Greek text available at the Perseus Digital Library.
 Pausanias, Description of Greece with an English Translation by W.H.S. Jones, Litt.D., and H.A. Ormerod, M.A., in 4 Volumes. Cambridge, MA, Harvard University Press; London, William Heinemann Ltd. 1918. . Online version at the Perseus Digital Library
 Pausanias, Graeciae Descriptio. 3 vols. Leipzig, Teubner. 1903. Greek text available at the Perseus Digital Library.
 Quintus Smyrnaeus, The Fall of Troy translated by Way. A. S. Loeb Classical Library Volume 19. London: William Heinemann, 1913. Online version at theio.com
 Quintus Smyrnaeus, The Fall of Troy. Arthur S. Way. London: William Heinemann; New York: G.P. Putnam's Sons. 1913. Greek text available at the Perseus Digital Library.
 Tzetzes, John, Book of Histories, Book II-IV translated by Gary Berkowitz from the original Greek of T. Kiessling's edition of 1826. Online version at theio.com

Children of Heracles
Trojans
Suitors of Penelope